Hypatima teramotoi is a moth in the family Gelechiidae. It was described by Ueda in 2012. It is found in Japan (Honshu, the Ryukyus).

The length of the forewings is 6-6.5 mm for males and 6–7 mm for females. The forewings are brownish grey with a large fuscous suffusion on the dorsum and a fuscous dot on the costa at the base. The hindwings are pale brownish grey.

The larvae feed on Quercus acutissima, Quercus serrata, Quercus variabilis, Quercus glauca and Quercus phillyraeoides. They have a pale green body and black head.

References

Hypatima
Moths described in 2012